Fibs is the second full-length studio album by the British composer and electronica musician Anna Meredith, released on 25 October 2019 on Moshi Moshi. It was nominated for the 2020 Mercury Prize.

Track listing

References

2019 albums
Anna Meredith albums